The ensaimada is a pastry product from Mallorca, Balearic Islands, Spain. It is a common cuisine eaten in southwestern Europe, Latin America and the Philippines. The first written references to the Mallorcan ensaïmada date back to the 17th century. At that time, although wheat flour was mainly used for making bread, there is evidence that this typical pastry product was made for festivals and celebrations.

The ensaïmada de Mallorca is made with strong flour, water, sugar, eggs, mother dough and a kind of reduced pork lard named saïm. The handmade character of the product makes it difficult to give an exact formula, so scales have been established defining the proportion of each ingredient, giving rise to an excellent quality traditional product. The name comes from the Spanish word saín, which means lard. 

In Mallorca and Ibiza there is a sweet called greixonera made with ensaïmada pieces left over from the day before.

Variants

The Balearic Islands
Among the variants of ensaimada the most common are:
 Llisa (literally "plain") with no extra ingredient.
 Cabell d'àngel (literally "angel's hair"), the stringy orange strands found inside pumpkins are cooked with sugar to make a sweet filling that is rolled inside the dough.
 Tallades (literally "sliced") covered with sobrassada and pumpkin, obtaining a bittersweet taste. It is typical of Carnival days, just before Lent, when meat (including lard and sobrassada) are not supposed to be eaten.
 Crema (literally "cream") with cream made with eggs.
 Filled with sweet cream, chocolate or turrón paste.
 Covered with apricot.

The Philippines

The Philippines also adopted the Mallorcan ensaïmada (commonly spelled ensaymada in Philippine languages). As a Spanish colony for over 300 years, the Philippine variant has evolved over the centuries and is perhaps one of the most common delicacies in the country. The localized pastry is a brioche baked with butter instead of lard and topped with grated cheese and sugar and can be found in almost all neighborhood bakeshops. Other versions are topped with buttercream, salted egg slices, and a specially aged type of Edam cheese called queso de bola. The ensaymada of Pampanga features a very rich dough with layers of butter and cheese.
  
It is customary to eat ensaymada with hot chocolate made with native tablea during the Philippine Christmas season. 

Due to its popularity, bakeshop chains such as Goldilocks, Red Ribbon, Julie's and Kamuning Bakery offer ensaymada with their own recipes.

Puerto Rico
In Puerto Rico, another Spanish colony until 1898, the ensaïmada is called pan de mallorca and is traditionally eaten for breakfast or as an afternoon snack.

See also
 Bread culture in Spain
 Roscón de reyes

References

External links
The ensaimada Report by MallorcaWeb, in English
Artisan baker and ensaïmada chef, in English
 General interest about ensaïmadas and vegetarianism, in English
 Traditional ensaïmada recipe Take a taste of Mallorca, in Spanish
Traditional Ensaimadas of Pampanga, Philippines
Ensaimada, the sweet temptation Video in English

Balearic cuisine
Culture of Mallorca
Spanish pastries
Ensaymada
Spanish breads
Spanish desserts
Spanish cuisine